Ronald Matthew Solt (born May 19, 1962) is a former American football guard in the National Football League. He played professionally for the Indianapolis Colts and the Philadelphia Eagles.

Biography
Solt was born in Bainbridge, Maryland and graduated from James M. Coughlin High School in Wilkes-Barre, Pennsylvania. He played college football at the University of Maryland.

He was drafted in the first round (nineteenth overall) of the 1984 NFL Draft. The Colts selected Solt with the draft pick received in the trade with the Denver Broncos, which had been forced by John Elway after he refused to play in Baltimore the year prior.

After making the Pro Bowl in 1987, Solt became entangled in a contract dispute and held out through the first month of the 1988 season, then was traded to the Philadelphia Eagles for their 1989 first round pick and their 1990 fourth round pick. Solt was suspended for four games at the beginning of the 1990 season for steroid use. Solt re-signed with the Colts as a Plan B free agent in 1992.

References

External links 
 databasefootball.com
 Pro=Football-Reference.com
 phily.com: Lining Up To Tackle Unfinished Business Ron Solt Is Still Bitter Over His Benching In The Eagles' Playoff Loss To The Washington Redskins

1962 births
Living people
People from Port Deposit, Maryland
Sportspeople from the Delaware Valley
Players of American football from Maryland
American football offensive guards
Maryland Terrapins football players
Indianapolis Colts players
Philadelphia Eagles players
American Conference Pro Bowl players
Ed Block Courage Award recipients